The 2020 Caribbean Club Championship (officially the 2020 Flow CONCACAF Caribbean Club Championship for sponsorship reasons) was the 22nd edition of the Caribbean Club Championship (also known as the CFU Club Championship), the first-tier annual international club football competition in the Caribbean region, held amongst clubs whose football associations are affiliated with the Caribbean Football Union (CFU), a sub-confederation of CONCACAF.

The winners of the 2020 CONCACAF Caribbean Club Championship would qualify to the 2021 CONCACAF Champions League, the second and third place teams would qualify to the 2020 CONCACAF League, while the fourth place team would play against the winners of the 2020 CONCACAF Caribbean Club Shield in a playoff match to determine the final Caribbean spot to the 2020 CONCACAF League. However, as the final stage of the tournament was cancelled due to the COVID-19 pandemic, the results in the group stage were used to determine the teams which qualified for the 2021 CONCACAF Champions League and the 2020 CONCACAF League.

Portmore United were the title holders, but were eliminated in the group stage.

Teams

Among the 31 CFU member associations, four of them were classified as professional leagues and each may enter two teams in the CONCACAF Caribbean Club Championship. However, one association was not allowed to enter this season, and as a result, only six teams from three associations entered the 2020 CONCACAF Caribbean Club Championship.

Associations not allowed to enter

The two teams from Trinidad and Tobago, W Connection (2018 TT Pro League champions) and Central (2018 TT Pro League runners-up), were not allowed to compete in the 2020 CONCACAF Caribbean Club Championship as the association did not properly execute its club licensing programme.

Group stage
The draw for the group stage was held on 4 December 2019, 10:00 EST (UTC−5), at the CONCACAF Headquarters in Miami, United States. The six teams were drawn into two groups of three. The two group stage hosts from Jamaica, Waterhouse and Portmore United, were placed in Pot 1 and assigned to Groups A and B respectively. The two teams from the Dominican Republic were placed in Pot 2, while the two teams from Haiti were placed in Pot 3. This ensured that teams from the same association could not be drawn into the same group.

The group stage was played between 29 January – 9 February 2020, at the Anthony Spaulding Sports Complex in Kingston, Jamaica. All times local, EST (UTC−5).

Tiebreakers
The ranking of teams in each group is determined as follows (Regulations Article 12.1):
Points obtained in all group matches (three points for a win, one for a draw, zero for a loss);
Goal difference in all group matches;
Number of goals scored in all group matches;
Points obtained in the matches played between the teams in question;
Goal difference in the matches played between the teams in question;
Number of goals scored in the matches played between the teams in question;
Fair play points in all group matches (only one deduction could be applied to a player in a single match):
Yellow card: −1 points;
Indirect red card (second yellow card): −3 points;
Direct red card: −4 points;
Yellow card and direct red card: −5 points;
Drawing of lots.

Group A

Group B

Final stage
The final stage was originally scheduled to be played between 8–13 May 2020, at the Estadio Olímpico Félix Sánchez in Santo Domingo, Dominican Republic. On 3 April 2020, CONCACAF announced the suspension of the final stage due to the COVID-19 pandemic, with the new dates to be confirmed later. On 7 August 2020, they provided an update on the final stage of the tournament, where they would make a final decision by the end of August to determine if it could be resumed towards the end of September. On 25 August 2020, CONCACAF announced that as it was impossible to organize the tournament in September in order to provide qualification for the 2020 CONCACAF League which would start in October, the final stage was cancelled.

All times local, AST (UTC−4).

Bracket
The semi-final matchups were planned to be:
SF1: Group A Winners vs. Group B Runners-up
SF2: Group B Winners vs. Group A Runners-up
The winners of SF1 and SF2 would play in the final, while the losers of SF1 and SF2 would play in the third place match. The losers of the third place match and the CONCACAF Caribbean Club Shield winners would play in the CONCACAF League playoff.

Semi-finals

Third place match
Winners would qualify for 2020 CONCACAF League preliminary round. Losers would advance to CONCACAF League playoff against 2020 CONCACAF Caribbean Club Shield winners for a place in 2020 CONCACAF League preliminary round, as long as the Shield winners comply with the minimum CONCACAF Club Licensing requirements for the CONCACAF League.

Final
Winners would qualify for 2021 CONCACAF Champions League. Losers would qualify for 2020 CONCACAF League round of 16.

CONCACAF League playoff
The CONCACAF League playoff would be played between the 2020 CONCACAF Caribbean Club Championship fourth-placed team and the 2020 CONCACAF Caribbean Club Shield winners, as long as the Shield winners comply with the minimum CONCACAF Club Licensing requirements for the CONCACAF League, with the winners qualifying for the 2020 CONCACAF League preliminary round.

Top goalscorers

Qualification to CONCACAF Champions League and CONCACAF League

Due to the cancellation of the 2020 CONCACAF Caribbean Club Shield and the final stage of the 2020 CONCACAF Caribbean Club Championship, qualification of teams from the Caribbean for the 2021 CONCACAF Champions League and the 2020 CONCACAF League was determined by the results of the group stage of the 2020 CONCACAF Caribbean Club Championship.

See also
2020 Caribbean Club Shield
2020 CONCACAF League
2021 CONCACAF Champions League

References

External links
Caribbean Club Championship, CONCACAF.com

2020
1
2020 CONCACAF League
2021 CONCACAF Champions League
January 2020 sports events in North America
February 2020 sports events in North America
International association football competitions hosted by Jamaica
International association football competitions hosted by the Dominican Republic
Association football events curtailed and voided due to the COVID-19 pandemic